Ricardo Heliodoro Chavarín Dueñas (born June 23, 1951) is a former Mexican football striker.

Club career
Born in Atenguillo, Jalisco, Chavarín began playing football with local side Club Deportivo Nacional in the Segunda Division. In 1971, he joined Club Atlas where he was nicknamed Astro Boy after a Japanese cartoon popular at the time.

International career
Chavarín made eleven appearances for Mexico, including the 1971 CONCACAF Championship finals.

References

External links

1951 births
Living people
Footballers from Jalisco
Association football forwards
Mexico international footballers
Atlas F.C. footballers
Leones Negros UdeG footballers
Toros Neza footballers
Mexican footballers